The following is a list of notable deaths in August 2007.

Entries for each day are listed alphabetically by surname. A typical entry lists information in the following sequence:
 Name, age, country of citizenship at birth, subsequent country of citizenship (if applicable), reason for notability, cause of death (if known), and reference.

August 2007

1
Sergei Antonov, 59, Bulgarian accused of involvement in attempt by Mehmet Ali Ağca to kill Pope John Paul II.
Ryan Cox, 28, South African professional road racing cyclist, ruptured artery following vascular surgery.
Robert Hughes, 95, Australian composer.
Veikko Karvonen, 81, Finnish athlete, bronze medalist in the 1956 Summer Olympics marathon.
Winfred P. Lehmann, 91, American linguist.
Tommy Makem, 74, Irish folk musician (The Clancy Brothers and Tommy Makem), lung cancer.
Pete Naktenis, 93, American baseball player.
Philip S. Paludan, 69, American history professor, authority on Abraham Lincoln and the American Civil War.
Norman Adrian Wiggins, 83, American third president of Campbell University.

2
Kafeel Ahmed, 28, Indian terrorist involved in the 2007 Glasgow International Airport attack, third degree burns.
Haitham al-Badri, Iraqi al Qaeda emir of Salahuddin Province and Golden Dome bomber, airstrike.
Chauncey Bailey, 58, American journalist, editor of The Oakland Post, shot.
Ed Brown, 78, American football quarterback Chicago Bears, Pittsburgh Steelers, prostate cancer.
Franco Dalla Valle, 62, Brazilian Roman Catholic Bishop of Juína.
Evan Enwerem, 71, Nigerian Senate President (1999).
Peter Eriksson, 48, Swedish neuroscientist.
Terry Kelly, 75, English footballer (Luton Town), dementia.
Holden Roberto, 84, Angolan founder and leader of the FNLA (1962–1999), after long illness.
Frank Rosenfelt, 85, American executive at MGM.

3
José Miguel Battle Sr., 77, Cuban founder and nominal leader of the "Cuban Mafia".
Ron Brown, 67, British Labour Party MP (1979–1992), liver failure.
James T. Callahan, 76, American actor (Charles in Charge), cancer.
John Gardner, 80, British thriller writer and James Bond continuation novelist, suspected heart failure.
Nasho Kamungeremu, 34, Zimbabwean golfer, heart attack.

4
Lee Hazlewood, 78, American country music singer and songwriter ("These Boots Are Made for Walkin'"), renal cancer.
Raul Hilberg, 81, Austrian Jewish Holocaust historian, lung cancer.
Frank Mancuso, 89, American Major League Baseball player, Houston City Councillor.
Santos Padilla Ferrer, 50, Puerto Rican mayor of Cabo Rojo, heart attack.

5
Henri Amouroux, 87, French journalist and historian.
Duncan W. Clark, 96, American physician.
Stanley Myron Handelman, 77, American comedian, heart attack.
Oliver Hill, 100, American lawyer, lead attorney on the Brown v. Board of Education case.
Jean-Marie Lustiger, 80, French Jewish-born Roman Catholic Archbishop Emeritus of Paris, cancer.
Amos Manor, 89, Israeli head of Shin Bet (1953–1963).
Janine Niépce, 86, French photojournalist.
Florian Pittiș, 63, Romanian actor and folk singer, prostate cancer.
Peter Graham Scott, 83, British film producer.

6
Heinz Barth, 86, German SS officer, Nazi war criminal, cancer.
Zsolt Daczi, 37, Hungarian guitarist, cancer.
Moe Fishman, 92, American representative of the Abraham Lincoln Brigade, pancreatic cancer.
Ah Jook Ku, 97, American journalist and writer, first Asian American Associated Press reporter.
Elie de Rothschild, 90, French banker, member of Rothschild dynasty, heart attack.
Paul Rutherford, 67, British trombonist.
Atle Selberg, 90, Norwegian-born American mathematician, heart failure.

7
Ernesto Alonso, 90, Mexican television producer and actor, pneumonia.
Hal Fishman, 75, American television news anchor since 1960, KTLA Prime News anchor since 1975, cancer.
Gato Del Sol, 28, American racehorse, won 1982 Kentucky Derby, euthanized.
Russell Johnson, 83, American architect and acoustician.
Hank Morgenweck, 78, American baseball umpire, cancer.
Wolfgang Sievers, 93, Australian photographer.
Sir Angus Tait, 88, New Zealand electronics innovator and businessman.
William F. Walker, 69, American academic, President of Auburn University (2001–2004).

8
Bertha Crowther, 85, British Olympic hurdler.
Richard Dahl, 74, Swedish high jumper.
Joybubbles, 58, American phone phreak.
Daniel Lam, 85, Hong Kong businessman.
Ma Lik, 55, Hong Kong Legislative Council member and chair of the DAB, colon cancer.
Melville Shavelson, 90, American film director and screenwriter.
Clarence Tex Walker, 61, American rhythm and blues musician, heart attack.
Julius Wess, 73, Austrian physicist.

9
Sakiusa Bulicokocoko, 57, Fijian musician, tumor.
Richmond Flowers Sr., 88, American Attorney General of Alabama (1963–1967).
Timothy Garden, Baron Garden, 63, British Air Marshal and Liberal Democrat peer, cancer.
Joe O'Donnell, 85, American presidential photographer, photographed effects of Hiroshima bombing, stroke.
Ulrich Plenzdorf, 72, German author.
Rolf Wiik, 78, Finnish Olympic fencer.

10
Henry Cabot Lodge Bohler, 82, American civil rights campaigner, member of Tuskegee Airmen, brain injuries following a fall.
Shagdaryn Chanrav, 58, Mongolian judoka.
Tom Cheasty, 73, Irish hurler.
James E. Faust, 87, American second counselor in the First Presidency of the LDS Church.
Irene Kirkaldy, 90, American civil rights campaigner, complications of Alzheimer's disease.
Jean Rédélé, 85, French creator of the Alpine automobile brand.
Mario Rivera, 68, Dominican Latin jazz saxophonist with Machito, Tito Puente, Tito Rodríguez orchestras, bone cancer.
Tony Wilson, 57, British owner of Factory Records, radio and TV presenter, journalist, heart attack.

11
Franz Antel, 94, Austrian film director.
Michael Frede, 67, German professor of Ancient Philosophy, swimming accident.
MacDonald Gallion, 94, American politician, Attorney General of Alabama (1959–1963, 1967–1971).
Joe Jimenez, 81, American professional golfer, won 1978 Senior PGA Championship, renal failure brought on by lung cancer.
Alexander H. Leighton, 99, American-Canadian sociologist and psychiatrist.
Arthur Levenson, 93, American Army Officer, NSA official and cryptologist.
Roberto Maidana, 79, Argentine journalist, pneumonia.
Herb Pomeroy, 77, American jazz trumpeter (Charlie Parker, Frank Sinatra), cancer.
Sukadji Ranuwihardjo, 76, Indonesian President of Gadjah Mada University (1973–1981).
Lluís Maria Xirinacs, 75, Spanish Catalan political activist and priest, natural causes.
*Zhang Shuhong, 50, Chinese businessman and factory co-owner involved in Fisher-Price toy recall, suicide by hanging.

12
Ralph Asher Alpher, 86, American physicist and college professor, respiratory failure.
Ronald N. Bracewell, 86, Australian physicist and radio astronomer, heart failure.
Christian Elder, 38, American sports car and Busch Series driver.
Joan Finnigan, 81, Canadian writer and poet.
Merv Griffin, 82, American talk show host, real estate tycoon, creator of Jeopardy! and Wheel of Fortune, prostate cancer.
Asa Hilliard, 73, American educationalist, historian and psychologist, malaria.
Allen McClure, 72, American Olympic sailor
Sir Ian McGeoch, 93, British admiral.
Elizabeth Murray, 66, American artist, lung cancer.
 Scott Rathner, 55, American photographer.
*Alwyn Rice Jones, 73, British Archbishop of Wales (1991–1999).
Mike Wieringo, 44, American comic book artist (The Flash, Spider-Man, Fantastic Four), heart attack.

13
Brian "Crush" Adams, 44, American professional wrestler, accidental overdose of pain killers and anti-depressants.
Brooke Astor, 105, American philanthropist, pneumonia.
Ox Miller, 92, American baseball player (Washington Senators).
Clifton Neita, 92, Jamaican editor of The Gleaner newspaper (1954–1979).
Phil Rizzuto, 89, American baseball player, member of the MLB Hall of Fame, and sports broadcaster, pneumonia.
Tim Royes, 42, British music video director, car accident.

14
John Biffen, 76, British Conservative member of the House of Lords, MP (1961–1997), septicaemia.
Horace Brearley, 94, British cricketer, father of Mike Brearley.
Jirair S. Hovnanian, 80, Armenian Iraqi-American home builder.
Tikhon Khrennikov, 94, Russian Soviet-era cultural functionary, composer and pianist.
Emory King, 76, Belizean historian, author and journalist, cancer.
John Lanham, 82, American former chief justice of the Republic of the Marshall Islands.
Diane Lewis, 54, American reporter (The Boston Globe), cancer.
Kotozakura Masakatsu, 66, Japanese yokozuna, complications of diabetes.
Eduardo Noriega, 90, Mexican actor, heart attack.
Kihei Tomioka, 75, Japanese Olympic cyclist.
Sayoko Yamaguchi, 57, Japanese fashion model, pneumonia.

15
Richard Bradshaw, 63, British conductor, Canadian Opera Company general director (1998–2007), heart attack.
Steven Campbell, 53, British painter, ruptured appendix.
John Gofman, 88, American nuclear physicist, heart failure.
Geoffrey Orbell, 98, New Zealand bush walker who rediscovered the Takahē in 1948.
Sam Pollock, 81, Canadian former general manager of Montreal Canadiens, Hockey Hall of Famer.
Liam Rector, 58, American poet, Folger Shakespeare Library program director, suicide by shotgun.
John Wallowitch, 81, American singer and songwriter, bone cancer.

16
Bahaedin Adab, 62, Iranian member of parliament, cancer.
John Blewett III, 33, American NASCAR driver, racing crash.
Jeroen Boere, 39, Dutch football player (West Ham, West Bromwich Albion, Crystal Palace, Portsmouth, Southend).
Will Edwards, 69, British Labour politician, MP for Merioneth (1966–1974).
Clive Exton, 77, British television and film writer, brain cancer.
Roland Mathias, 91, British poet and literary critic.
Robert Mignat, 86, French cyclist.
The Missing Link, 68, Canadian professional wrestler, cancer.
Vito Pallavicini, 83, Italian lyricist/pop composer.
Max Roach, 83, American jazz drummer.

17
John Austin, 68, British Anglican prelate, Bishop of Aston (1992–2005).
Edward Avedisian, 71, American artist.
John Belk, 87, American Democratic politician, mayor of Charlotte, North Carolina (1969–1977).
Jos Brink, 65, Dutch television host, actor, minister of religion and writer, colorectal cancer.
Bill Deedes, 94, British journalist, editor of The Daily Telegraph (1974–1986) and Conservative politician.
Franco Foschi, 76, Italian writer and politician.
Carolyn Goodman, 91, American psychologist and civil rights activist.
Eddie Griffin, 25, American basketball player of Seton Hall, Rockets and Timberwolves, car accident.
Max Hodge, 91, American television writer, creator of Mr. Freeze on the 1960s Batman series.
Victor Klee, 81, American mathematician, complications of intestinal surgery.
Tanja Liedtke, 29, German choreographer appointed as Sydney Dance Company artistic director, road accident.
Elmer MacFadyen, 64, Canadian politician, Prince Edward Island Progressive Conservative cabinet minister (1996–2007), heart attack.
Alison Plowden, 75, British historian.

18
Stephen Bicknell, 49, British expert on the pipe organ.
Michael Deaver, 69, American Deputy White House Chief of Staff (1981–1985), pancreatic cancer.
Norman Ickeringill, 84, Australian Olympic wrestler.
Lucien Jarraud, 84, Canadian radio host.
Jon Lucien, 65, American smooth jazz singer/songwriter, respiratory failure and complications of kidney surgery.
Magdalen Nabb, 60, British author, stroke.
Viktor Prokopenko, 62, Ukrainian footballer and coach (FC Shakhtar Donetsk), thrombus.

19
Daniel Brewster, 83, American Senator (Democrat) from Maryland (1963–1969), liver cancer.
Roch La Salle, 78, Canadian Progressive Conservative politician, Quebec cabinet minister (1968–1988).

20
Gabriel Glorieux, 77, Belgian Olympic cyclist.
Berthold Grünfeld, 75, Norwegian psychiatrist.
Wild Bill Hagy, 68, American Baltimore Orioles cheerleader of the 1970s and 1980s.
Leona Helmsley, 87, American hotelier, heart failure.
Chas Poynter, 68, New Zealand politician, mayor of Wanganui (1986–2004), lung disease.

21
Caroline Aigle, 32, French aviator, first French female fighter pilot, cancer.
Rose Bampton, 99, American opera singer.
Frank Bowe, 60, American disability rights activist, author and teacher, cancer.
Čabulītis, c. 72, American alligator considered to be Europe's oldest.
Antonio De Gaetano, 73, Italian Olympic racewalker. 
Siobhan Dowd, 47, British writer and PEN activist, breast cancer.
Elizabeth Hoisington, 88, American Army general, heart failure.
*Howe Yoon Chong, 84, Singaporean politician.
Qurratulain Hyder, 81, Indian novelist.
Hana Ponická, 85, Slovak writer and dissident.
Adam Watson, 93, British diplomat and academic.

22

Butch van Breda Kolff, 84, American basketball coach (Princeton, Lakers, Pistons, Jazz).
José Ribamar Celestino, 65, Brazilian footballer.
Jacek Chmielnik, 54, Polish actor, accidental electrocution.
Keith Knight, 51, Canadian actor, brain cancer.
Sir Patrick Macnaghten, 11th Baronet, 80, British aristocrat.
Grace Paley, 84, American writer and political activist, breast cancer.

23
Cuesta Benberry, 83, American historian known for her studies of quilting, congestive heart failure.
William John McKeag, 79, Canadian politician, Lieutenant Governor of Manitoba (1970–1976).
David Perry, 78, New Zealand cricketer.
Martti Pokela, 83, Finnish folk musician.
Robert Symonds, 80, American actor (Dynasty, The Exorcist, Catch Me If You Can), prostate cancer.
Dušan Třeštík, 74, Czech historian.
Sir Philip Wilkinson, 80, British banker.

24
Abdul Rahman Arif, 91, Iraqi politician, President of Iraq (1966–1968).
Mark Birley, 77, British nightclub owner (Annabel's), stroke.
Andrée Boucher, 70, Canadian politician, mayor of Sainte-Foy (1985–2001) and Quebec City (2005–2007), heart attack.
William E. McAnulty, Jr., 59, American lawyer, first African American Kentucky Supreme Court Justice, lung cancer.
Aaron Russo, 64, American movie producer (Trading Places, The Rose), cancer.
Adam Watson, 93, British diplomat.

25
Benjamin Aaron, 91, American labor law expert and member of Presidential commissions, cerebral hemorrhage.
Raymond Barre, 83, French economist, Prime Minister of France (1976–1981), Mayor of Lyon (1995–2001).
Jim Carlson, 74, American screenwriter.
Eduardo Prado Coelho, 63, Portuguese writer and political and cultural critic.
Richard Cook, 50, British jazz writer, cancer.
Édouard Gagnon, 89, Canadian Roman Catholic Cardinal.
Ray Jones, 18, British footballer (QPR), car accident.
Alberto de Lacerda, 78, Portuguese poet, BBC radio presenter, founded Portucale magazine.
Linda Smith, 58, Canadian writer.)

26
Edward Brandt, Jr., 74, American doctor and public health official, directed initial response to AIDS, lung cancer.
Oliver Byrne, 63, Irish CEO of soccer club Shelbourne F.C., after short illness.
Chuck Comiskey, 81, American Chicago White Sox executive in the 1950s, grandson of team founder Charles Comiskey.
Roy McLean, 77, South African cricketer, after long illness.
Judah Nadich, 95, American rabbi and chaplain, heart attack.
Edward Seidensticker, 86, American scholar and translator of Japanese literature, complications from a fall.
Gaston Thorn, 78, Luxembourg Prime Minister (1974–1979), President of the European Commission (1981–1985).

27
Driss Basri, 69, Moroccan Interior Minister (1979–1999).
Galina Dzhugashvili, 68, Russian granddaughter of Joseph Stalin, cancer.
Richard T. Heffron, 76, American film and television director.
Eduardo Malapit, 74, American who was first mayor of Filipino American ancestry.
Emma Penella, 77, Spanish actress (El Verdugo, Aquí no hay quien viva), renal and heart failure.
Doug Riley, 62, Canadian musician ("Doctor Music"), heart failure.
Hans Ruesch, 94, Swiss racing driver, author and activist against animal testing.
Gad Yaacobi, 72, Israeli former Minister and Labor Party Knesset member, heart failure.

28
Anacleto Angelini, 93, Chilean businessman, South America's richest man, emphysema.
David Garcia, 63, American journalist, White House correspondent (ABC), complications of a liver condition.
Arthur Jones, 80, American inventor of the Nautilus exercise machines.
Hilly Kristal, 75, American club owner (CBGB), complications of lung cancer.
Smain Lamari, 67, Algerian head of intelligence services, after long illness.
Paul MacCready, 81, American aviation pioneer and inventor.
Nikola Nobilo, 94, Croatian-born New Zealand winemaker.
Antonio Puerta, 22, Spanish footballer (Sevilla FC), arrhythmogenic right ventricular dysplasia.
Darryl Sly, 68, Canadian Olympic ice hockey player.
Francisco Umbral, 72, Spanish writer, pneumonia.
Miyoshi Umeki, 78, Japanese-born American actress (Sayonara, Flower Drum Song, The Courtship of Eddie's Father), Oscar winner (1958), cancer.

29
Sir James Fletcher, 92, New Zealand industrialist (Fletcher Challenge).
Aldo Forte, 89, American football player.
Richard Jewell, 44, American security guard wrongly accused of the Atlanta Olympics bombing, diabetes.
Margie Lang, 83, American baseball player (AAGPBL).
Vladimir Lobanov, 53, Russian Olympic speed skater.
Pierre Messmer, 91, French Prime Minister (1972–1974), Free French fighter, French Academician.
Chaswe Nsofwa, 28, Zambian footballer, heart attack.
Alfred Peet, 87, American entrepreneur and the founder of Peet's Coffee & Tea.

30
Ramrao Adik, 77, Indian former Deputy Chief Minister of Maharashtra.
Banarsi Das Gupta, 89, Indian former Chief Minister of Haryana.
Augustine Harris, 89, British Bishop Emeritus of Middlesbrough, former Auxiliary Bishop of Liverpool.
Michael Jackson, 65, British writer and beer expert (The Beer Hunter), heart attack.
Nancy Littlefield, 77, American film producer, cancer.
K. P. H. Notoprojo, 98, Indonesian gamelan performer.
Igor Novikov, 77, Soviet Olympic modern pentathlete.
Ong Hok Ham, 74, Indonesian historian.
Charles Vanik, 94, American politician, U.S. Representative from Ohio (1955–1981).
José Luis de Vilallonga, 87, Spanish aristocrat, author and actor (Breakfast at Tiffany's).
John Wedgwood, 87, British physician.

31
Gay Brewer, 75, American professional golfer, lung cancer.
Willie Cunningham, 77, British football player.
Barton Kirkconnell, 90, Jamaican Olympic sailor
Kees Klop, 59, Dutch professor of political ethics and former chairman of the NCRV.
Karloff Lagarde, 79, Mexican lucha libre professional wrestler.
Doug Maxwell, 80, Canadian curling innovator, cancer.
Jean Jacques Paradis, 78, Canadian army general, Commander of the Canadian Army.
James Brian Tait, 90, British World War II pilot.
Sulev Vahtre, 81, Estonian historian.

References

2007-08
 08